Princess Giorgio (Italian:La principessa Giorgio) is a 1920 Italian silent film directed by Roberto Roberti and starring Francesca Bertini and Livio Pavanelli.

Cast
 Alberto Albertini 
 Francesca Bertini 
 Luigi Cigoli 
 Beppo Corradi 
 Gemma De Sanctis 
 Silvia Maitre 
 Livio Pavanelli 
 Nicola Pescatori 
 Giovanni Schettini

References

Bibliography
 Cristina Jandelli. Le dive italiane del cinema muto. L'epos, 2006.

External links

1920 films
1920s Italian-language films
Films directed by Roberto Roberti
Italian silent feature films
Italian black-and-white films